The Well-Tempered Critic is a collection of essays by the Canadian literary critic Northrop Frye. The collection was originally published in Bloomington, Indiana, by the Indiana University Press in 1963.

The collection presents lectures delivered by Frye at the University of Virginia in March 1961 for the Page-Barbour Foundation, with a certain amount of expansion and some revisions.

References
Frye, Northrop. The Well-Tempered Critic; Bloomington: Indiana University Press, 
Frye, Northrop. The Well-Tempered Critic; Markham, Ontario: Fitzhenry & Whiteside,  (1983 re-issue)

1963 non-fiction books
Books by Northrop Frye
Indiana University Press books
Canadian essay collections
Books of lectures
Books about literature